Four Last Songs is a 2007 British comedy-drama film written and directed by Francesca Joseph and starring Stanley Tucci, Rhys Ifans, and Hugh Bonneville.

The film's title is taken from Four Last Songs, 1948 composition of Richard Strauss, surrounding acceptance of death.

Plot
Larry (Stanley Tucci), an expat piano player, settled in a remote island village seven years ago. Now he runs a small boutique hotel with his girlfriend, Miranda (Jessica Hynes). Every evening he plays the piano at a local restaurant to inattentive customers; all this has left him highly unsatisfied, and he has always wanted to do something big in life. So one day he decides to host a gala concert dedicated to a native son and noted composer, Valentin Lucinsky, whose widow Veronica (Marisa Paredes) still resides in a grand villa in the village.

At first Larry manages to convince Veronica to allow the concert to be held at the local amphitheatre, where famous pianist Narcisco Ortega (Virgile Bramly) would play her late great spouse's music, 'chosen by her'. Things soon start to go awry, as his long lost daughter Frankie (Jena Malone) arrives out of the blue, looking for him, another social-climber, Sebastian Burrows (Hugh Bonneville), latches on to the project convincing Veronica to give it to him and Larry's girlfriend grows suspicious of his relationship with the composer's former muse, Helena (Emmanuelle Seigner), who leads a secluded life on the island. As the movie progresses, several sub plots reveal a variety of estrangements between various key characters, and gradually they are healed amidst the rising melodrama surrounding the concert.

Cast
 Stanley Tucci - Larry
 Rhys Ifans - Dickie
 Hugh Bonneville - Sebastian Burrows
 Jena Malone - Frankie
 Jessica Hynes - Miranda (as Jessica Stevenson)
 Karl Johnson - Erico
 Virgile Bramly - Narcisco Ortega
 Marisa Paredes - Veronica
 Emmanuelle Seigner - Helena
 María Esteve - Sweetie

Production
The film was shot entirely on location on the island of Mallorca (Majorca) in the Mediterranean Sea - part of the Balearic Islands archipelago, in Spain. The Spanish version of the film is titled 'Mallorca's Song'.

Credits
 Casting Director - Karen Lindsay Stewart
 Production Designer - John Stevenson
 Costume designer - Julian Day
 Production Company - BBC Films
 Domestic Video Distributor  - Anchor Bay Entertainment

References

External links
 
 
 

2007 films
Films shot in the Balearic Islands
Films shot in Spain
BBC Film films
2000s English-language films